The Arizona State Sun Devils baseball program at the Arizona State University (ASU) is part of the Pac-12 Conference. Since it became a member of the Pac-12, it had the highest winning percentage, at .681, of all schools that participate in Division I baseball within the conference. ASU's NCAA leading 54 consecutive 30 win seasons was the longest streak in the nation. The Sun Devils have had just four losing seasons in program history (1963, 2017, 2018, and 2022). The Sun Devils had been nationally ranked during at least a part of every season of their 58-year history until 2017. The Sun Devils have finished 27 times in the Top 10, 22 times in the Top 5, and 5 times as the No. 1 team in the nation.

ASU is one of the most successful college baseball programs in the country. The Sun Devils have won five national championships, the fourth-most by any school, and are 1st in total number of alumni to ever play in Major League Baseball. Notable Sun Devil baseball alumni include Barry Bonds, Reggie Jackson, Sal Bando, Dustin Pedroia, Andre Ethier, Bob Horner, Paul Lo Duca, and Rick Monday.

History

The Bobby Winkles years (1959–1971)
Arizona State University adopted baseball as a varsity sport in 1959. Under the guidance of coach Bobby Winkles, the Sun Devils finished their first season with a 28–18–1 record. In 1964, Coach Winkles led the team to a 44–7 record, winning the Western Athletic Conference title. They beat Utah twice in the WAC playoffs and then beat Air Force 6–1 and 7–6 to win District 7 and advanced to the 1964 College World Series. In their first game the Sun Devils were shut out 7–0 by the Missouri Tigers. The next day they beat Mississippi 5–0 before losing their next game two days later 4–2 to Maine. The following year the Sun Devils went 9–3 in the WAC to win back-to-back conference championships. In 1965, Rick Monday was taken first overall in the inaugural Major League First-Year Player Draft.

Their first game in the 1965 College World Series was a blowout win against Lafayette. The offense again exploded against St. Louis 13–3. They beat Ohio State 9–4, then beat St. Louis again 6–2 where they faced Ohio State. Arizona State lost the first game 7–3 but won the next game 2–1 to win their first national championship. The following season the defending national champions were unable to defend their title as they finished the season 41–11, finishing second in the conference, and failed to make the postseason.

In 1967 the Sun Devils were able to get back to the College World Series as they went 53–12 and made an appearance in the WAC championship losing the first game to BYU 3–0, before coming back to win the next two 6–3 and 4–3 to win the WAC championship. In the District 7 playoff series, they split the first two games of the series, winning 11–0 then losing 5–2. They were able to win the final game of the series 6–0 advancing to the 1967 College World Series. They opened winning two blowout games 7–2 and 8–1 against Oklahoma State and Boston College before winning a close one against Stanford 5–3. They were shut out in the next game against the Houston Cougars 3–0 before coming back to beat Stanford 4–3 and avenging the loss against Houston to win a blowout 11–2 to win their second national championship.

Once again, the Sun Devils followed up their national championship season with a second place conference finish and failed to receive a postseason berth. In 1969 the Devils were able to return to the World Series winning the WAC championship against BYU, then swept Idaho 7–1 and 3–2 in the District 7 playoff. They dropped their first game of the 1969 College World Series 4–0 to Texas, however they would win their next five games to win their third national championship in five years, winning the championship game 10–1 against Tulsa. This was the program's third national championship in the last five years.

After the 1971 season, Coach Winkles was hired by the California Angels. Bobby Winkles was ASU's first varsity baseball coach and maintained an impressive 524–173 record during his 13 years of coaching for the Sun Devils. A three-time NCAA Coach of the Year, Winkles took the ASU program from scratch and built it into one of the premier powerhouses in all of college baseball.

The Packard Stadium years
Winkles Field-Packard Stadium at Brock Ballpark, located in Tempe, was the home of Arizona State baseball from 1974 to 2014. Dimensions of Packard are  down the lines,  in the power alleys and 395 to straightaway center. Located five feet beyond the center-field wall is the "Green Monster," a 30-foot-high batting eye. The outfield wall is lined with orange trees and just beyond the left field fence lies the Salt River which winds its way through the Valley of the Sun.

The facility is the home of two national championship teams and 17 NCAA regional tournaments. Arizona State's all-time record at Packard is 1,035–272–1*, for a winning percentage of .792. In 2010, ASU went 36–3 at home and hosted a Super Regional for the fourth straight season, clinching a berth in the College World Series on their home field for the third time in four seasons. Since 2007, the Sun Devils have an astounding home record of 146–15*.

A 2003 coaches survey published in Baseball America ranked ASU's baseball facilities among the Top 15 in the nation.

The final game played at Packard Stadium was on May 20, 2014, where ASU defeated Abilene Christian 4–2. The Sun Devils opened the 2015 season at Phoenix Municipal Stadium.

Head coaches

Former and current players in MLB

 Jamie Allen
 Gary Allenson
 Doug Baker
 Chris Bando
 Sal Bando
 Eddie Bane
 Alan Bannister
 Floyd Bannister
 Tony Barnette
 Austin Barnes
 Jake Barrett
 Marty Barrett
 Chris Beasley
 Willie Bloomquist
 Randy Bobb
 Barry Bonds
 Ryan Bradley
 Hubie Brooks
 Travis Buck
 Ryan Burr
 Kole Calhoun
 Mike Colbern
 Brooks Conrad
 Jim Crawford
 Jacob Cruz
 Colin Curtis
 Alvin Davis
 Ike Davis
 Mike Devereaux
 Chris Duffy
 Jeff Duncan
 Duffy Dyer
 Jake Elmore
 Mike Esposito
 Andre Ethier
 Larry Fritz
 Gary Gentry
 Shawn Gilbert
 Tuffy Gosewisch
 Larry Gura
 Eric Helfand
 Doug Henry
 Kevin Higgins
 Donnie Hill
 Bob Horner
 Dave Hudgens
 Darrell Jackson
 Reggie Jackson
 Mitch Jones
 Merrill Kelly
 Mike Kelly
 Ian Kinsler
 Jason Kipnis
 Lerrin LaGrow
 Ken Landreaux
 Jeff Larish
 Mike Leake
 Jim Lentine
 Jack Lind
 Pat Listach
 John Littlefield
 Paul Lo Duca
 Pete Lovrich
 Sean Lowe
 Jerry Maddox
 Drew Maggi
 Deven Marrero
 Adam McCreery
 Oddibe McDowell
 Cody McKay
 Luis Medina
 Lemmie Miller
 Blas Minor
 Gabe Molina
 Rick Monday
 Paul Moskau
 Ricky Lee Nelson
 Chris Nyman
 Jim Otten
 Bob Pate
 Dustin Pedroia
 Rick Peters
 Ken Phelps
 John Poloni
 Paul Powell
 Gary Rajsich
 Len Randle
 Scott Reid
 Brady Rodgers
 Ron Romanick
 Andrew Romine
 Kevin Romine
 Dennis Sarfate
 Alan Schmelz
 Mike Schwabe
 Brian Serven
 Sterling Slaughter
 Eric Sogard
 Josh Spence
 Tim Spehr
 Todd Steverson
 Mel Stocker
 Craig Swan
 Jon Switzer
 Spencer Torkelson
 Jim Umbarger
 Ed Vande Berg
 Fernando Viña
 Don Wakamatsu
 Brett Wallace
 Trevor Williams
 Antone Williamson
 Bump Wills

See also
 List of NCAA Division I baseball programs
 1965 Arizona State Sun Devils baseball team

Notes

References

External links